Nones (autonym: nònes) is a dialect named after and spoken in the Non Valley in Trentino, northern Italy. It is estimated that around 30,000 people speak in Non Valley, Rabbi Valley and the low Sole Valley.

Ethnologue and Glottolog classify it as a dialect of the Ladin language, It is alternatively considered as a dialect belonging to the range of Gallo-Italic languages of Northern Italy.

Further reading 
Battisti, Carlo. (1908). Die Nonsberger Mundart (Lautlehre). Sitzungsberichte der Philosophisch-Historische Klasse der Kaiserlichen Akademie der Wissenschaften in Wien, Vol. 160, 3. Vienna: Hölder.
Di Biasi, Ilaria. (2005). Grammatica Noneso-Ladina. Trento: Regione Trentino-Alto Adige.
Fellin, Luciana. (2003). Language ideologies, language socialization, and language revival in an Italian alpine community. Texas Linguistics Forum 45: 46-57. 
Politzer, Robert L. (1967). Beitrag zur Phonologie der Nonsberger Mundart. Innsbruck: Institut für Romanische Philologie der Leopold-Franzens-Universität.
Quaresima, Enrico. (1964). Vocabolario anaunico e solandro, raffrontato col trentino. Venice: Istituto per la Collaborazione Culturale.
Sandri, Ivana. (2003). Tratti ladini nella parlata della Val di Non. Trento: La Grafica.

References

Languages of Trentino-Alto Adige/Südtirol
Rhaeto-Romance languages
Ladin language

de:Nonstal#Sprache